Frei José de Jesus Maria Mayne (7 June 1723 – 23 December 1792) was a Portuguese Catholic priest who occupied several important posts such as Minister General of the 
Third Order Regular of Saint Francis, Chief Chaplain of the Royal Armada, and confessor to King Peter III.

José Mayne is intimately associated with the history of the Lisbon Academy of Sciences. In keeping with the intellectual movement of the Enlightenment, he instituted a school of natural history integrated into the Academy: to achieve this, he established a cabinet of curiosities by donating his important collection to the Academy and made significant contributions to its library.

Mayne's interest in natural history and science emphasised the study of the wonders of Creation as a way to fight the modern materialistic philosophical views espoused by foreign thinkers in France (Voltaire, Rousseau, Helvétius, Boulanger, Diderot, Robinet, La Mettrie) and Britain (Hobbes, Locke, Berkeley, Coward, Cudworth, Dodwell, Toland, Collins), which he actively opposed as destructive errors that endangered both religion and State.

Works
Declamação evangelica na trasladação de Sancta Rosa de Viterbo, recitada no convento de Nossa Senhora de Jesus (Lisbon, Miguel Manescal da Costa, 1757)
Dissertação sobre a alma racional, onde de mostram os fundamentos da sua immortalidade (Lisbon, Regia Offic. Typ., 1778)

References

Notes

1723 births
1792 deaths
18th-century Portuguese Roman Catholic priests
Third Order Regular Franciscans
Portuguese naturalists
Portuguese Roman Catholic theologians
People from Porto